Horseshoe Bend National Military Park is a 2,040-acre, U.S. national military park managed by the National Park Service that is the site of the last battle of the Creek War on March 27, 1814. General Andrew Jackson's Tennessee militia, aided by the 39th U.S. Infantry Regiment and Cherokee and Lower Creek allies, won a decisive victory against the Upper Creek Red Stick Nation during the Battle of Horseshoe Bend at this site on the Tallapoosa River. Jackson's decisive victory at Horseshoe Bend broke the power of the Creek Nation.

Over 800 Upper Creeks died defending their homeland. This was the largest loss of life for Native Americans in a single battle in the history of United States.

On August 9, 1814, the Creeks signed the Treaty of Fort Jackson, which ceded 23 million acres (93,000 km2) of land in Alabama and Georgia to the United States government.

References

External links

 

National Battlefields and Military Parks of the United States
Creek War
National Register of Historic Places in Tallapoosa County, Alabama
Protected areas of Tallapoosa County, Alabama
National Park Service areas in Alabama
Historic districts in Tallapoosa County, Alabama
Protected areas established in 1956
1956 establishments in Alabama
Historic districts on the National Register of Historic Places in Alabama
Conflict sites on the National Register of Historic Places in Alabama
Parks on the National Register of Historic Places in Alabama